Nawab Muhammad Mushtaq Ali Khan Bahadur, (1856-25 February 1889) was a Nawab of the princely state of Rampur from 1887 to 1889, succeeding his father Sir Nawab Kalb Ali Khan Bahadur. Owing to continued ill-health, he was unable to properly rule and govern the state and so left its affairs in the hand of an administrative council. However, he was successful in continuing the beneficiaries of his predecessors, particularly in the areas of agriculture and irrigation. He died at the age of 32 in 1889 and was succeeded by his son, Sir Hamid Ali Khan Bahadur.

Titles
1856-1877: Nawabzada Muhammad Mushtaq Ali Khan, Wali Ahad Bahadur
1877-1887: Nawabzada Muhammad Mushtaq Ali Khan, Wali Ahad Bahadur
1887-1889: His Highness 'Ali Jah, Farzand-i-Dilpazir-i-Daulat-i- Inglishia, Mukhlis ud-Daula, Nasir ul-Mulk, Amir ul-Umara, Nawab Muhammad Mushtaq 'Ali Khan Bahadur, Mustaid Jang, Nawab of Rampur, KIH

Honours
Empress of India Medal, silver-1877

References

Muhammad Mushtaq Ali Khan
1856 births
1889 deaths
Indian Sunni Muslims